Karaś  is a village in the administrative district of Gmina Iława, within Iława County, Warmian-Masurian Voivodeship, in northern Poland.

Notable residents
Max Winkler (1875–1961), Mayor of Graudenz

References

Villages in Iława County